John Churchill, 1st Duke of Marlborough (1650–1722) was an English soldier and statesman.

John Churchill may also refer to:

John C. Churchill (1821–1905), American lawyer and politician
John Churchill, 7th Duke of Marlborough (1822–1883)
 John Churchill (lawyer), English lawyer of the seventeenth century
John Churchill (priest) (1920–1979), Anglican Dean of Carlisle
John Churchill (died 1682) (1622–1682), MP for Dorchester
John Churchill (1657–1709), MP for Dorchester
John Churchill (sport shooter) (born 1939), British rifle shooter
John Churchill (publisher) (1801–1875), English medical publisher
John Churchill (judge) (c. 1620–1685), English lawyer and attorney-general
John Churchill, Marquess of Blandford (1686–1703), British nobleman
John Gibbs Churchill (1905–1975), New Zealand trade unionist and local politician

See also
Jack Churchill (disambiguation)
John Spencer-Churchill (disambiguation)